Louis François Mendy (born 2 March 1999) is a Senegalese track and field athlete who specialises in the 110 metres hurdles and also competes as a sprinter. At the 2019 African Games, he competed in the 110 metres hurdles, winning a bronze medal after winning the semifinal.

Louis François Mendy got an Olympic Scholarship and was then selected on an universality place to participate to 2020 Summer Games on 110 m hurdles.

References

External links

1999 births
Living people
African Games medalists in athletics (track and field)
African Games bronze medalists for Senegal
Athletes (track and field) at the 2019 African Games
Athletes (track and field) at the 2020 Summer Olympics
Senegalese male hurdlers
Olympic athletes of Senegal
20th-century Senegalese people
21st-century Senegalese people